Frederick Pollock may refer to:

Sir Frederick Pollock, 1st Baronet (1783–1870), British lawyer and Tory politician
Sir Frederick Pollock, 3rd Baronet (1845–1937), British jurist and grandson of the 1st baronet
Frederick Richard Pollock (1827–1899), British army officer and administrator in British India